George's Bottom Cave is a cave in the British Overseas Territory of Gibraltar. This together with Tina's Fissure and Levant Cave are a close group of three caves at the southern end of the Upper Rock Nature Reserve.

As the group could feel a draught from this hole they suspected it was the entrance to a cave and they arranged to have a large boulder moved to reveal a larger but still small entrance. The cave was named after George Palao of the  Gibraltar Museum. Having entered the cave, visitors find that going is tight which necessitates crawling at some points. Crawling in made no easier by the cave coral which together with the curtains, columns, straws, and helictites create a variety of limestone formations. However, the cave has six different levels which contain a wide variety of formations in numerous chambers and fissures.

See also
List of caves in Gibraltar

References

Caves of Gibraltar